Phi Iota Alpha, established on December 26, 1931, is the oldest Latino Fraternity in existence, and works to motivate people, develop leaders, and create innovative ways to unite the Latino community. The organization has roots that stem back to the late 19th century to the first Latin American fraternity, and the first Latin American student organization in the United States. The brotherhood is composed of undergraduate, graduate, and professional men committed towards the empowerment of the Latin American community by providing intensive social and cultural programs and activities geared towards the appreciation, promotion and preservation of Latin American culture.

Membership in Phi Iota Alpha is open to all men regardless of race, creed, color, or national origin who challenge themselves to develop a strong network for the advancement of Latino people. Phi Iota Alpha's membership includes prominent and accomplished educators, politicians, businessmen, and four former presidents of Latin American countries. Phi Iota Alpha utilizes motifs from the Pan-American revolutionary period and uses images and colors depicting the time of Latin American revolutionaries and thinkers to represent the organization.

History

Origins

The origins of Phi Iota Alpha began at the Rensselaer Polytechnic Institute (RPI), Troy, New York, in 1898. A group of Latin American students organized the Union Hispano Americana (UHA) as a cultural and intellectual secret society based on the ideology of Pan-Americanism.
The immediate goals of the UHA was to provide a cultural environment for students of Latin America and Spain. The UHA was the first association of Latin American students ever founded in the United States. The UHA expanded to several colleges and universities in the United States; however, due to the secrecy imposed upon its members, not many records were kept.

The expansion and growth of the UHA was based on compromise and the ultimate need of similar organizations to unify and become more powerful. In the Northeastern Province of the United States, a group of Latin American students decided to organize a cultural and intellectual fraternity; as a result Pi Delta Phi fraternity was founded at Massachusetts Institute of Technology (MIT) in 1916. Shortly after its foundation, Pi Delta Phi initiated a search to expand to other colleges and universities where they became aware of the existence of other similar organizations.

Consolidation

Pi Delta Phi established communications with Phi Lambda Alpha fraternity, which had been recently founded in 1919, in the Western Province of the United States, at the University of California, Berkeley. After some communication, these two organizations realized the existence of a non-Greek letter secret society, the Union Hispano Americana (UHA). As a result of intensive correspondence and various interviews, the three organizations merged. In their merger agreement, the three organizations adopted the name of Phi Lambda Alpha fraternity, with the distinctive emblem & constitution of Pi Delta Phi, and the goals & motto of the UHA. This new union was formalized on June 11, 1921, in the City of New York.

After  was organized, other societies joined it: the "Club Latino-Americano" founded in 1919 at Colorado School of Mines; the "Federación Latino-Americana" founded in 1926 at Columbia University which joined in 1928; the "Club Hispania" founded in 1929 of Cornell University which joined in 1931; the "Club Hispano-Americano" founded in 1921 at (then) Tri-State College in Angola, Indiana which joined in 1929 and the Alfa Tenoxtitlan Militant chapter founded in 1929 made up of members of the old  in Mexico.

Meanwhile, in the Southeastern Province of the United States, another similar organization was under development. In 1904, an organization with similar goals as Phi Lambda Alpha was founded under the name "Sociedad Hispano-Americana" at Louisiana State University. In 1912, recognizing the benefit of the disciplinary background of a Greek system, the society transformed itself into Sigma Iota and became the first Latin American–based fraternity in the United States. Between 1912 and 1925, Sigma Iota expanded rapidly in the United States, Central America and Europe. As a result of this, Sigma Iota became the first international Latin American–based fraternity. By 1928, Sigma Iota had lost many of its chapters and therefore sought to stabilize its operations by consolidating its chapters in the United States with a more stationary and well-rooted organization.

Phi Lambda Alpha was seeking to expand throughout the United States and to promote the ideology of Pan Americanism. Sigma Iota Fraternity was in search of revitalizing some of its defunct chapters. Thus both organizations complemented each other and began to work towards the creation of the fraternity now known as Phi Iota Alpha.

Establishment
In December 1931 in Troy, New York, delegates from Phi Lambda Alpha and Sigma Iota assembled with the objective of forming a unified fraternity to address the needs of Latin American Students in universities in the United States.

On December 26, 1931, the first day of a three-day convention, Phi Iota Alpha was born as both groups agreed to the merger. They resolved to unify under one name, one banner, one organization and one ideal. The next day of business was dedicated to preparing the details of revising the constitution, working on the creation of a shield to represent the newly formed national Latino brotherhood. On December 28, by the end of the three-day convention, the majority of the merger was completed. The last step in the merger was the ratification of some of the chapters of Sigma Iota that were not represented at the convention.

The fraternity was incorporated as a national organization on October 28, 1936, under the laws of the State of Louisiana, under the name and title of Phi Iota Alpha Fraternity.

International expansion

After the unification of Sigma Iota and Phi Lambda Alpha, Phi Iota Alpha goal was to expand on the national level and develop a plan for it existing and its potential international possibilities. Phi Iota Alpha sponsored the 1932 convention in New York City with the purpose of forming the Union Latino Americana (ULA) with hopes of expanding its ideals internationally. The ULA was a Pan American governing body of Latino fraternities which provides the framework for the implementation of Pan-American ideology. The ULA organized Latin America into 22 zones with each of the 21 Latin American countries constituting a zone, and Phi Iota Alpha representing the 22nd zone in the United States. By 1937, the ULA had several well-established and functional zones including:
  – Phi Iota Alpha in the D.C. and the states of the USA
  – Phi Kappa Alpha in 
  – Phi Tau Alpha in 

In September 1938, the Phi Sigma Alpha zone decided to separate from the ULA and eventually, to form Phi Sigma Alpha Fraternity of Puerto Rico which exists to this day. Twelve years later, Phi Tau Alpha Fraternity established itself, in Mexico, at the Juarez Institute.

History: 1939–1983
The outbreak of World War II greatly hindered the growth Phi Iota Alpha in the United States. After the war the Fraternity drafted and implemented a new expansion strategy. As a result, the post war period saw positive internal growth for the Fraternity. In the early 1950s, Phi Iota Alpha eradicated any remnant of its political agenda. With only a few chapters, the Fraternity continued to pursue its mission.
The Fraternity was again incorporated as a national organization on January 9, 1953, when the Secretary of State of New York accepted the incorporation of Phi Iota Alpha Fraternity.

The 1960s were very challenging years for Phi Iota Alpha. The effects of the Vietnam War and the '60s counter-culture created an anti-institutional atmosphere amongst many college students. In addition, this drastically reduced the enrollment of Latin American students in American universities. This in turn hindered potential membership to the organization. As a result, by 1968, after many years of struggle, the only active undergraduate chapters were at LSU, and at RPI. The chapter at RPI became inactive in 1973 with the graduation of its Secretary General. The Secretary General took with him the chapter's official fraternity documents. By 1979, the last active brother from the chapter at LSU graduated, thereby marking the closing of the undergraduate chapter at LSU.

From 1979 to 1983, the Fraternity witnessed a period of inactivity only at the undergraduate level. Some efforts were made to re-establish Phi Iota Alpha at the undergraduate level, but these efforts were not successful. Throughout this period, brothers continued to maintain communication, and continued to accomplish the mission of the organization. The history, ideals and goals of the Fraternity never diminished; they simply did not have active undergraduate members to cultivate them. Phi Iota Alpha continued to exist with the many Alumni members and Alumni chapters as they continued to develop their professional lives mostly in Latin American countries and in the United States.

History: 1984–2000
In 1984, a group of young men at RPI, set upon learning about the fraternity that once existed on their campus, re-established Phi Iota Alpha. After the re-emergence of the Fraternity, the last Secretary General instituted the members of the RPI chapter as the Alpha Chapter of Phi Iota Alpha. In the 1980s the Fraternity dedicated its efforts to rebuilding the organizational infrastructure and to expand to several universities in New York State. The fraternity was considered officially revived nationwide in 1987 at the collegiate level due this effort. By 2000, Phi Iota Alpha had chartered chapters across the United States; which include the re-establishments of former Sigma Iota fraternity chapter Syracuse University and former Phi Lambda Alpha fraternity chapter Columbia University.

75th anniversary

Phi Iota Alpha declared 2006 and 2007 to celebrate the Diamond Jubilee. Preparations consisted of nationwide activities and events, including the commissioning of intellectual and scholarly works, presentation of exhibits, lectures, artwork and musical expositions, the production of video presentations. The 75th Anniversary Celebration was launched with a pilgrimage to Rensselaer Polytechnic Institute on October 13, 2006, and culminated with the Semi sesquicentennial Anniversary Convention on the weekend of July 27 to July 29, 2007, in New York City.

Fraternal entities

National programs
Phi Iota Alpha asserts that through community outreach initiatives, the fraternity supplies voice and vision to the struggle of Latino and Hispanic Americans in the United States and Latin America. The fraternity provides for charitable endeavors through its Foundations, providing academic scholarships and support for community development projects.

Affiliations

The fraternity maintains dual membership in the National Association of Latino Fraternal Organizations (NALFO) and the North American Interfraternity Conference (NIC).

NALFO is composed of 19 Latino Greek-letter sororities and fraternities, of which Phi Iota Alpha is the oldest member. The association promotes and fosters positive interfraternal relations, communication, and development of all Latino fraternal organizations through mutual respect, leadership, honesty, professionalism and education.

The NIC serves to advocate the needs of its member fraternities through enrichment of the fraternity experience; advancement and growth of the fraternity community; and enhancement of the educational mission of the host institutions.

Phi Iota Alpha is also a member of the NIC Latino Fraternal Caucus. One of the only four Latino fraternities that are part of the NIC. Prior to joining NALFO, Phi Iota Alpha was a member of the Concilio Nacional de Hermandades Latinas.

Fraternal ideology

Beliefs
Members of Phi Iota Alpha share a lifelong commitment to Latin American culture. Involves intellectual development, cultural consciousness, personal growth, personal achievement and social awareness.
Members of Phi Iota Alpha believe that the Latin American community in the United States and in the Latin American countries are in need of new sources of intellectual capital to identify, address and solve the difficult challenges they face. Therefore, the organization is dedicated to developing in its members an awareness of the common values and traditions of the nations of Latin America and to preparing them to become active participants in the process of advancing the social and economic conditions of all Latin Americans.

The fraternity instills in its members a global Latino perspective. This is an orientation that transcends the existing national boundaries that have separated Latin America. It builds on the spirit and traditions of Pan-Americanism, and supports and promotes actions leading to an eventual unification of all the countries of Latin America.

Mission
 Promotion of personal, community, and Pan-American development through the ideals of Simón Bolívar and José Martí as well as other Pan-American intellectuals and their philosophies;
 Creation of a Latin American consciousness,
 Intensification of education with a Latin American character;
 Economic and social mobilization of Latin American communities globally;

 Intensification of contact between Pan-American Countries with the intention of forming a unified network of professional and economic contacts in order to ultimately achieve the unification of Latin America;
 Conservation of the integrity of the Latin American character.
 Rejection of war and violence as a means to achieving unification.

Pillars
The organization has five pillars, respected historical figures from Latin America:

Symbolism

Pan-American symbolism

Phi Iota Alpha chose to use Pan-American symbolism to be more representative of the goals and ideals of the organization.
Phi Iota Alpha utilizes motifs from the Pan-American revolutionary period and uses images and colours depicting the time of Latin American revolutionaries and thinkers to represent the organization. This is in contrast to most other Latino fraternities that traditionally echo themes from the Pre-Columbian period of Latin American history. Phi Iota Alpha's constant reference to Pan-American ideals in hymns and poems are further examples of Phi Iota Alpha's mission to imbue with a Pan-American cultural perspective.

Colours
The Colours of the fraternity in Spanish Heraldry are oro, azur, gules and plata.
The Colours of the fraternity in English Heraldry are or, azure, gules and argent.
The Colours of the fraternity in Spanish are oro, azul marino, rojo and blanco.
The Colours of the fraternity in English are gold, navy blue, red and white.

Badge

The badge is the most prominent symbol of membership. The Official Badge of the Fraternity is a gold pin in the shape of a Roman fasces topped with a double-edged ax and crowned in the superior of the fasces of six stars, each star with an argent pearl at its centre. The fasces are held together by two ropes in gold that tie the fasces at the top and at the bottom and in which the middle is tied in the form of an x-shaped cross. In the middle of the fasces, above the ropes lies an argent riband in which engraved to it are the Greek Letters Phi Iota Alpha. The badge dies at the bottom with a golden sphere that culminates the fasces.

Flag

The official flag consists of three bands in or, azure, and gules of equal height. The Greek letters ΦΙΑ in Or are located on the azure field at the center outlined with argent. The chapter letter is carried on the Gules band sinister in argent. The flag is modeled after the flag of Simón Bolívar's Republic of Gran Colombia. The short-lived republic that consisted of present-day Colombia, Venezuela, Ecuador, and Panama.

Coat of arms
The Fraternity insignia, coat of arms or crest, consists of a blazon composed of an or (gold) shield, gules chevron lowered a third charged with six argent stars, three dexter, three sinister. At the fess point, under an oval azure field, the Latin American Map in Or, surrounded by a steel chain made of twenty-one links. The Greek letters Phi Iota Alpha in azure in dexter, fess point and sinister of the chief, occupying a third part of the canton. At the base, a Phrygian Cap in gules facing dexter. The principal bordure is double in azure and argent, respectively. The shield is crowned with a frontal steel helm with nine bars and adorned with argent lambrequins falling at dexter and sinister. The crest is formed by a Roman fasces in or, in vertical position, and a double-edged ax. A pair of lions rampant with sanguine tongues supports the shield. The riband for the motto at the Lions' feet, in argent, with azure letters states: Semper Parati Semper Juncti.

Membership

Phi Iota Alpha's membership is predominantly Latino and Hispanic American in composition. Members come from the United States, the Caribbean, Latin America, Africa, Asia, and Europe. As Phi Iota Alpha expanded, the ranks of membership grew to include a plethora of prominent and accomplished, educators, politicians, businessmen, and four former presidents of Latin American countries.

Notable members

Politics

 Miguel Hernandez Agosto – former President of the Popular Democratic Party of Puerto Rico
 Emilio Bacardi – former mayor of Santiago, Cuba and son of Bacardi Founder Facundo Bacardi
 Eric Arturo Delvalle – former President of Panama
 Carlos Roberto Flores – former President of Honduras
 Enrique Oltuski –  Deputy Minister of Communication for former President Manuel Urrutia Lleo of Cuba; author of Vida Clandestina: My Life in the Cuban Revolution
 Mariano Ospina Pérez – former President of Colombia
 Carlos Lleras Restrepo – former President of Colombia
 Alfonso Robelo Callejas – Founder of the Democratic Movement Party of Nicaragua
 Manny De Los Santos – City of New York 72nd Assembly Male District Leader of Inwood/Marble Hill
Andy Vargas – Massachusetts State Representative, 3rd Essex District

Medicine
 Dr. Rudolph Matas – "father of modern vascular surgery"

Fraternal dates of celebration
 April 14 (Pan American Day)
 September 15 – October 15 (National Hispanic Heritage Month)
 October 12 (Day of the Race)
 December 26 (Establishment Anniversary and Day of the illuminated Latin Americans)

See also

 Phi Lambda Alpha
 Phi Sigma Alpha
 Sigma Iota
 Union Latino Americana

References

External links
 Official website

 
Latino fraternities and sororities
Hispanic and Latino American organizations
Student organizations established in 1931
Student societies in the United States
International student societies
National Association of Latino Fraternal Organizations
North American Interfraternity Conference
Phi Sigma Alpha
Rensselaer Polytechnic Institute
1931 establishments in New York (state)